Levin is the largest town and seat of the Horowhenua District, in the Manawatū-Whanganui region of New Zealand's North Island. It is located east of Lake Horowhenua, around 95 km north of Wellington and 50 km southwest of Palmerston North.

The town has a population of  making it the 30th largest urban area in New Zealand, and third largest in Manawatū-Whanganui behind Palmerston North and Whanganui.

Levin is a service centre for the surrounding rural area, and a centre for light manufacturing.

To the west of the main town lies Lake Horowhenua, which covers some 3.9 sq/km.  It is currently undergoing regeneration.

History and culture

19th century

The area now occupied by Levin was connected to both Wellington and Palmerston North by railway in 1886. The area was surveyed in 1888, and European settlement of began following the sale of suburban and rural sections, which commenced on 19 March 1889.

The town was named after William Hort Levin, a director of the Wellington and Manawatu Railway Company.

The name is a variation of the Jewish clan name Levi. Unlike the usual pronunciation of the surname, stress is placed on the second syllable of the word. However Levin's great-grandson, Peter Levin, claims his forebear would have pronounced his surname as Levene, and that this pronunciation was in common use for many years and is always used by the family.

20th century

Levin was made a borough in 1906.

21st century

The town celebrated its centenary in 2006 and the bowls club celebrated its in 2007.

Marae

Kawiu Marae and Te Huia o Raukura meeting house, located just north of the town, are a meeting place for Muaūpoko.

In October 2020, the Government committed $945,445 from the Provincial Growth Fund to upgrade Kawiu Marae and nearby Kohuturoa Marae, creating 50 jobs.

Demographics

Levin had a population of 17,679 at the 2018 New Zealand census, an increase of 1,422 people (8.7%) since the 2013 census, and an increase of 1,707 people (10.7%) since the 2006 census. There were 7,062 households. There were 8,346 males and 9,324 females, giving a sex ratio of 0.9 males per female, with 3,336 people (18.9%) aged under 15 years, 2,988 (16.9%) aged 15 to 29, 6,651 (37.6%) aged 30 to 64, and 4,698 (26.6%) aged 65 or older.

Ethnicities were 77.0% European/Pākehā, 25.4% Māori, 8.4% Pacific peoples, 5.2% Asian, and 1.8% other ethnicities (totals add to more than 100% since people could identify with multiple ethnicities).

The proportion of people born overseas was 16.3%, compared with 27.1% nationally.

Although some people objected to giving their religion, 47.6% had no religion, 39.4% were Christian, 0.6% were Hindu, 0.2% were Muslim, 0.3% were Buddhist and 2.8% had other religions.

Of those at least 15 years old, 1,293 (9.0%) people had a bachelor or higher degree, and 4,332 (30.2%) people had no formal qualifications. The employment status of those at least 15 was that 5,277 (36.8%) people were employed full-time, 1,719 (12.0%) were part-time, and 768 (5.4%) were unemployed.

Economy

Retail

Levin Mall is a mall covering 791 m², with 14 retailers including a Farmers department store.

Transport
Levin lies on State Highway 1, which forms the town's main street, Oxford Street. State Highway 57 forms the eastern boundary of the town, and meets State Highway 1 between Levin and the Ohau River, Wellington.

Levin is on the North Island Main Trunk with a station used by the Capital Connection long distance commuter train between Wellington and Palmerston North. It is also served by 8 InterCity buses a day each way.

Buses run for shoppers to Waikanae on Tuesdays and Thursdays and on Fridays to Shannon, Foxton Beach, Foxton and Waitarere Beach. A commuter bus runs via Foxton to Palmerston North.

Schools
There are nine schools in the Levin urban area:

 Horowhenua College is a state secondary (Year 9–13) school.
 Waiopehu College is a state secondary (Year 9–13) school.

Notable people
Jack Afamasaga – rugby league player
Sir Paul Beresford – British politician
Suzy Clarkson – newsreader
Kay Cohen – fashion designer
Joy Cowley – novelist
Jaxon Evans – racing driver
Cathryn Finlayson – hockey player
Rebecca Gibney – actress
Nathan Guy – politician
Nicky Hager – author
Darren Hughes – politician
Dean Kent – Olympic and Commonwealth Games swimmer
Doug Kidd – politician
David Lomax – rugby league player
Johnny Lomax – rugby league player
Matthew Saunoa – New Zealand Idol winner 2006
George Silk – photographer, LIFE magazine
Carlos Spencer – rugby union player
Richard Sylvan – philosopher and logician
James Tamou – rugby league player
Codie Taylor – rugby union player
Roger Twose – cricketer
Sonny Whakarau – rugby league player

References

 
Populated places in Manawatū-Whanganui